Paul Gardner may refer to:
Paul Gardner (writer) American writer and filmmaker
Paul Gardner (journalist) (born 1930), American soccer journalist and author
Paul Gardner (ice hockey) (born 1956), Canadian ice hockey player
Paul Gardner (football administrator), Melbourne Football Club president
Paul Gardner (Minnesota politician) (born 1967), member of the Minnesota House of Representatives
Paul Gardner (footballer) (born 1957), English footballer (soccer player)
Paul Gardner (priest) (born 1950), Christian priest and author

See also
Paul Garner (disambiguation)
Paul Gardiner (1958–1984), British musician